Benny Fomsgaard Andersen  (born 1 June 1963 in Ringkøbing) is a Danish Olympic Star class sailor. He finished ninth in the 1992 Summer Olympics together with Mogens Just Mikkelsen.

References

1963 births
Living people
Olympic sailors of Denmark
Danish male sailors (sport)
Star class sailors
Sailors at the 1992 Summer Olympics – Star
People from Ringkøbing-Skjern Municipality
Sportspeople from the Central Denmark Region